Finland competed at the 2016 Summer Paralympics in Rio de Janeiro, Brazil, from 7 September to 18 September 2016. They earned three medals, one gold, one silver and one bronze.

Disability classifications

Every participant at the Paralympics has their disability grouped into one of five disability categories; amputation, the condition may be congenital or sustained through injury or illness; cerebral palsy; wheelchair athletes, there is often overlap between this and other categories; visual impairment, including blindness; Les autres, any physical disability that does not fall strictly under one of the other categories, for example dwarfism or multiple sclerosis. Each Paralympic sport then has its own classifications, dependent upon the specific physical demands of competition. Events are given a code, made of numbers and letters, describing the type of event and classification of the athletes competing. Some sports, such as athletics, divide athletes by both the category and severity of their disabilities, other sports, for example swimming, group competitors from different categories together, the only separation being based on the severity of the disability.

Medalists

Finnish Paralympic team

The Finnish Paralympic team consists of 26 athletes and 2 guide athletes, who compete in 11 sports. Chef de mission is Kimmo Mustonen.

Archery

Jere Forsberg earned Finland a spot at the Rio Games following his performance at the 2015 World Archery Para Championships. He qualified the country after his performance in the compound men's open. Jean Pierre Antonios earned Finland a second qualifying spot after making the round of eight in the  W1 men event.

Legend: W = win, L = loss

Athletics

Track and road events

Legend: SB = season best, Q = qualified by place, PB = personal best, RR = European record, NR = Finnish record

Field events

Legend: SB = season best, PB = personal best

Cycling 

With one pathway for qualification being one highest ranked NPCs on the UCI Para-Cycling male and female Nations Ranking Lists on 31 December 2014, Finland qualified for the 2016 Summer Paralympics in Rio, assuming they continued to meet all other eligibility requirements.

Equestrian 
The country earned an individual slot via the Para Equestrian Individual Ranking List Allocation method.

Goalball 

The Finland men's national goalball team qualified for the Rio Games after finishing second at the 2014 IBSA Goalball World Championships. Finnish women failed to qualify at the 2014 World Championships, finishing two spots out of medal contention in fifth place at the home hosted event. Finland's men enter the tournament ranked 6th in the world.

Legend: W = win, L = loss

Paratriathlon

Powerlifting

Sailing

One pathway for qualifying for Rio involved having a boat have top seven finish at the 2015 Combined World Championships in a medal event where the country had nor already qualified through via the 2014 IFDS Sailing World Championships.  Finland qualified for the 2016 Games under this criteria in the 2.4m event with a thirteenth-place finish overall and the third country who had not qualified via the 2014 Championships.  The boat was crewed by Niko Salomaa.

Legend: 14 = excluded score

Shooting 

The first opportunity to qualify for shooting at the Rio Games took place at the 2014 IPC Shooting World Championships in Suhl. Shooters earned spots for their NPC.  Finland earned a qualifying spot at this competition  in the R5 – 10m Air Rifle Prone Mixed SH2  event as a result of the performance of Minna Sinikka Leinonen.

Swimming 

Legend: Q = qualified for the next phase

Table tennis 

Legend: L = loss

See also
Finland at the 2016 Summer Olympics

References

Nations at the 2016 Summer Paralympics
2016
Paralympics